Boris Stephan "Babe" Dimancheff (September 6, 1922 – October 17, 2008) was an American football halfback in the  National Football League (NFL) for the Boston Yanks (1945–1946), the Chicago Cardinals (1947–1950), and the Chicago Bears (1952). He played college football at Purdue University.

Early years
Dimancheff attended George Washington Community High School, where he lettered in football, basketball and track. He was a captain of both the football and basketball teams. In 1940, he received the Dyer Medal Award for Best Character and Athlete in the City of Indianapolis. As a senior, he was named All-state and All-city in both football and basketball.

He moved on to play football at Butler University, where he played left halfback and was named the freshman team captain. In his second year he received All-Conference honors, before military service in World War II interrupted his college career.

He returned to play at Purdue University, starting at fullback during the 1943 and 1944 seasons. He starred in a powerful backfield, alongside Tony Butkovich.  In 1943, he led the Boilermakers to a perfect season, the Big Ten Conference title and a #3 AP ranking.  His senior season (1944) was his best year as he was selected as the team captain, named to the International News Service's All-American team, named All-Big Ten (1st team) and was selected as the Most Valuable Player in the Big 9 Conference. He played in the East–West Shrine Game in 1944.

In 2007, he was inducted into the Indiana Football Hall of Fame. In 2009, he was inducted into the Purdue Athletics Hall of Fame.

Professional career
Dimancheff  was selected by the Boston Yanks in the third round (27th overall) of the 1944 NFL Draft. He began his playing career in 1945 as a halfback.

In 1947, he played for the Chicago Cardinals and led them to win the NFL championship. The next year, he helped the team reach the NFL championship game again, where they lost to the Philadelphia Eagles. At one time he held the franchise records for Most Yardage Gained on Kickoff returns and Longest Kickoff return. He finished his career with the Chicago Bears in 1952.

Coaching career
Following his NFL career he moved into the coaching ranks, In 1951, he became the backfield coach at Butler University. In 1953 he coached at Purdue University.

From 1954 to 1956 he coached at Hamtramck High School, in Hamtramck, Michigan.  There he led the Maroons to two state titles. His star player was Willie Fleming.

After winning his second state title, Dimancheff returned to the NFL, where he spent 12 seasons as a coach and director of player personnel. In 1957, he began as the backfield and receivers coach for the Pittsburgh Steelers and was also the team's director of player personnel. He spent the 1957 through 1959 seasons with the Steelers.

In 1960, he joined the Dallas Cowboys for their inaugural season, becoming the first backfield coach in franchise history. After two years in Dallas, he accepted the offensive coordinator position at Wake Forest University. By 1964, he was the head coach and general manager of the Canton Bulldogs of the United Football League. In 1965, he moved with the franchise to Philadelphia and coached the Bulldogs for one season in the Continental Football League.

By 1966, Dimancheff was back in the NFL as the receivers coach and director of player personnel for George Halas and the Chicago Bears. Dimancheff spent seven seasons in Chicago before moving on to the World Football League (WFL) and a job as the offensive coordinator for the Southern California Sun. When the league folded after the 1975 season, he remained in Southern California.

References

External links
 Indiana Football Hall of Fame profile

1922 births
2008 deaths
American football halfbacks
Boston Yanks players
Butler Bulldogs football players
Chicago Cardinals players
Chicago Bears coaches
Chicago Bears executives
Chicago Bears players
Continental Football League coaches
Dallas Cowboys coaches
Pittsburgh Steelers coaches
Pittsburgh Steelers executives
Purdue Boilermakers football players
United Football League (1961–1964) coaches
Wake Forest Demon Deacons football coaches
Southern California Sun coaches
High school football coaches in Michigan
Players of American football from Indianapolis
American people of Slavic descent